Anita Raj Kaur d/o Mohinder Singh (born 31 July 1986) is a Malaysian badminton player. In 2004, she became the first non-Chinese player to win the National Championships title. In 2009, Kaur won the women's singles title at the Croatian International tournament, and in 2010, she won double title at the Welsh International in the women's singles and doubles events.

Personal life 
She is the Indian descent with distant relatives in Chandigarh. Kaur is a daughter of Mohinder Singh and Jasmal Kaur, and her sister Ravinder Kaur also represented Malaysia in badminton tournaments.

Achievements

IBF Grand Prix 
The World Badminton Grand Prix sanctioned by International Badminton Federation (IBF) from 1983 to 2006.

Women's singles

BWF International Challenge/Series 
Women's singles

Women's doubles

  BWF International Challenge tournament
  BWF International Series tournament
  BWF Future Series tournament

References

External links 
 

1986 births
Living people
Malaysian female badminton players
Malaysian sportspeople of Indian descent
Malaysian people of Punjabi descent
Competitors at the 2007 Southeast Asian Games
Southeast Asian Games bronze medalists for Malaysia
Southeast Asian Games medalists in badminton
21st-century Malaysian women